Port-Saint-Père is a commune in the Loire-Atlantique department in western France.

Geography
Port-Saint-Père is situated on the west bank of the Acheneau, northwest of the Lac de Grand-Lieu.

Population

Sights
 Planète Sauvage, safari park

Transport
Port-Saint-Père-Saint-Mars station is served by train services between Pornic, Saint-Gilles-Croix-de-Vie and Nantes.

See also
Communes of the Loire-Atlantique department

References

Communes of Loire-Atlantique
Pornic Agglo Pays de Retz